Ron Elleway was an Australian rules footballer who played for the  Football Club.

References

1942 births
Living people
Port Adelaide Football Club (SANFL) players
Port Adelaide Football Club players (all competitions)
Australian rules footballers from South Australia